James Conroy can refer to:
James H. Conroy, member of 19th General Assembly of Prince Edward Island in 1854
James Gervé Conroy (1838–1915), Irish-born Canadian politician in Newfoundland
James Conroy, Irish republican militant in The Squad (Irish Republican Army unit) in 1919
James J. Conroy, owner of American KTVO TV-station in 1955–1964
Jim Conroy (Canadian football) (1937–2011), Canadian football player
James Conroy (archer), Irish archer
James Conroy, British mixed martial fighter, lost to Joseph Duffy (fighter) in 2013

See also 
James Conroy-Ward (born 1947), English music publisher and former actor
Tim Conroy (Timothy James Conroy, born 1960), former American baseballer
Will Conroy (William James Conroy, born 1982), American baseballer